San Rosa del Sur is a town and municipality located in the Bolívar Department, northern Colombia, around 720 km away from the department's capital, Cartagena.

Municipalities of Bolívar Department